Cotalpa flavida is a species of beetle in the family Scarabaeidae.

References

Further reading

 
 
 
 

Rutelinae
Beetles described in 1878